Mad Tom Lake is a lake north of Wilmurt in Herkimer County, New York. It drains southwest via Mad Tom Brook which flows into the West Canada Creek.

See also
 List of lakes in New York

References 

Lakes of New York (state)
Lakes of Herkimer County, New York